Butka is a village in Talitsky District, Sverdlovsk Oblast, Russia. It is known as the birthplace of the first President of the Russian Federation, Boris Yeltsin.

Footnotes

Cities and towns in Sverdlovsk Oblast
Boris Yeltsin